Helt Township is one of five townships in Vermillion County, Indiana, United States. As of the 2010 census, its population was 2,610 and it contained 1,181 housing units.

History
Helt Township was named for Daniel Helt, a pioneer who settled in Vermillion County in 1818.

The Possum Bottom Covered Bridge and Salem Methodist Episcopal Church are listed on the National Register of Historic Places.

Geography

Cities
 Dana

Unincorporated towns
 Alta at 
 Bono at 
 Highland at 
 Hillsdale at 
 Jonestown at 
 Saint Bernice at 
 Summit Grove at 
 West Clinton at 
(This list is based on USGS data and may include former settlements.)

Extinct towns
 Early Station at 
 Montezuma Station at 
 Randall at 
 Toronto at 
 West Dana at

Cemeteries
The township contains nine cemeteries: Andrews, Bales, Bogart, Dinsmore, Helts Prairie, Higbie, Highland, Hollingsworth and Pisgah.

Landmarks
 Miller Park

School districts
 South Vermillion Community School Corporation

Political districts
 Indiana's 8th congressional district
 State House District 42
 State Senate District 38

References
 U.S. Board on Geographic Names (GNIS)
 United States Census Bureau 2007 TIGER/Line Shapefiles

External links
 Indiana Township Association
 United Township Association of Indiana

Townships in Vermillion County, Indiana
Townships in Indiana